Nong Phra is a subdistrict in the Wang Thong District of Phitsanulok Province, Thailand.

Geography
Nong Phra lies in the Nan Basin, which is part of the Chao Phraya Watershed.

Administration
The following is a list of the subdistrict's muban, which roughly correspond to the villages:

Temples
The following is a list of Buddhist temples in the Nong Phra Subdistrict:
วัดหนองบัว in muban 7
วัดเจริญผล in muban 4
วัดสะเดา in muban 1
วัดดงแตง
วัดบัวทอง in muban 3
วัดหนองบัวเจริญผล in muban 5

References

Tambon of Phitsanulok province
Populated places in Phitsanulok province